WPBC, now WJZA, is a radio station (1310 AM) licensed to serve Decatur, Georgia, United States, which held the call sign WPBC from 1998 to 2017.

WPBC may also refer to:

 Wealthy Park Baptist Church, a fundamentalist church in Michigan
 Western Pentecostal Bible College, an undergraduate seminary
 Weymouth and Portland Borough Council, a local government borough council in Dorset, England
 Winsted Precision Ball Company, a subsidiary of Barden Corporation
 WPBC-FM, a radio station in the Twin Cities region of Minnesota